Lectionary 1575 (in the Gregory-Aland numbering), α 1037 (Soden), is a Greek-Coptic diglot lectionary manuscript of the New Testament, dated paleographically to the 9th-10th century.

Description 

The Greek text of this codex is a representative of the Alexandrian text-type. Kurt Aland did not place it in any Category.

Parts of this manuscript were formerly numbered as uncials 0129 and 0203. When was discovered that they belonged to the same manuscript as ℓ 1575, it was shown they were parts of the same lectionary.

The part formerly known as uncial 0129 is in the National Library of France (Copt. 129,11) in Paris; that formerly known as uncial 0203 is located at the British Library in London; the remainder of ℓ 1575 is located at the Österreichische Nationalbibliothek (Pap. K. 16.17) in Vienna.

According to the Alands, uncial 0129 contains a small part of the Pauline epistles, on two parchment leaves (35 cm by 25.5 cm). The text is written in two columns per page, 33 lines per page, in uncial letters.

It is dated by the INTF to the 9th-century.

See also 

 List of New Testament lectionaries
 List of New Testament uncials
 Coptic versions of the Bible
 Textual criticism

References

Further reading 

 Hermann von Soden, Die Schriften des Neuen Testaments, in ihrer ältesten erreichbaren Textgestalt hergestellt auf Grund ihrer Textgeschichte, Verlag von Arthur Glaue, Berlin 1902-1910, p. 120.
 E. Amélineau, Notice des manuscripts coptes de la Bibliothèque Nationale (Paris, 1895), pp. 410-411.
 K. Schüster, Eine Griechisch-koptische Handschrift des Apostolos (l 1575 und 0129, 0203), ANTF 3, pp. 218-265.

External links 

 Lectionaries at the Encyclopedia of Textual Criticism

Greek New Testament lectionaries
Greek New Testament uncials
Greek-Coptic diglot manuscripts of the New Testament
9th-century biblical manuscripts
Bibliothèque nationale de France collections
Biblical manuscripts of the Austrian National Library
British Library collections